The  is a Japanese language daily newspaper published by . The company was founded in 1879.

The newspaper is based in Okayama City, Japan. The newspaper covers national and international news stories and also news from Okayama and neighboring prefectures. It is distributed throughout Okayama prefecture, eastern Hiroshima, and parts of Kagawa. Stories can be read online, though most stories are only available to subscribers.

With The Nikkei, the newspaper owns TV Setouchi.

Notes

Further reading

External links
 Sanyo Shimbun digital (Japanese)

1879 establishments in Japan
Publications established in 1879
Daily newspapers published in Japan
Japanese-language newspapers
Okayama Prefecture
Mass media in Okayama